Phyla nodiflora, the frog fruit, sawtooth fogfruit, or turkey tangle, is a flowering plant in the family Verbenaceae, and is native to the area from northern South America to southern United States. It can be found in tropical areas around the globe, a naturalized species in many places. This plant is cited in Flora Brasiliensis by Carl Friedrich Philipp von Martius.

It is often grown as an ornamental plant for ground cover, and is often present in yards or disturbed areas as a lawn weed.

The inflorescence consists of a purple centre encircled by small white-to-pink flowers. The flower takes on a match-like look, which is why the plant is sometimes called matchweed. It is similar to the related species Phyla lanceolata, but differs in having much shorter leaves that are often blunt and much more rounded. Both species are common as weeds and in the ornamental environment.

Common names in India include bukkan (Hindi), ratolia, vakkan (Marathi), poduthalai (Tamil), neerthippali (Malayalam), vasir, and vasuka (Sanskrit). It is used medicinally to treat suppuration, common colds, and lithiasis.

Synonyms
Lippia canescens Kunth, Lippia incasiomalo (Small) Tildsoan, Lippia lickiflora (L.) Michx., Lippia nodiflora var. canescens (Kunth) Kuntze, Lippia nodiflora var. reptans (Kunth) Kuntze, Lippia nodiflora var. rosea (D. Don) Munz, Lippia reptans Kunth, Polyumn incisa Small, Phyla nodiflora var. antillana Moldenke, Phyla nodiflora var. canescens (Kunth) Moldenke, Phyla nodiflora var. incisa (Small) Moldenke, Phyla nodiflora var. longifolia Moldenke, Phyla nodiflora var. repens (Spreng.) Moldenke, Phyla nodiflora var. reptans (Kunth) Moldenke, Phyla nodiflora var. rosea (D. Don) Moldenke, Phyla nodiflora var. texensis Moldenke.

Notes

References

External links

Jepson Manual Treatment

nodiflora
Flora of Brazil
Flora of the United States
Flora of Florida